Dimaksean (also transliterated as Dimaksian or Dimaksyan) was a region and family of the old Armenia c. 400–800.

The known rulers are:

Muche Dimakseani  c. 450
Hemaiak I Dimakseani  c. 450
Thathoul Dimakseani  c. 451
Hemaiak II Dimakseani  c. 451
Gazrik Dimakseani  c. 451
Ordi Dimakseani  c. 482
Sargis Dimakseani  c. 598

See also
List of regions of old Armenia

Early medieval Armenian regions
Armenian noble families